Ouvrage Gondran is a lesser work (petit ouvrage) of the Maginot Line's Alpine extension, the Alpine Line. The ouvrage consists of one entry block, one infantry block and one observation block. Gondran was commenced in June 1933, and was intended to cover the gap between Janus and Les Aittes. The site is close to two older forts, designated Gondran C and Gondran D. The Maginot fortification became known as Gondran E. 

The fortified area is near the Les Gondrans portion of the Montgenèvre ski area.

Description
See Fortified Sector of the Dauphiné for a broader discussion of the Dauphiné sector of the Alpine Line.
The ouvrage was never completed. As the emergency exit was on the same level as the main portion it was used during peacetime as the main entrance. It is sometimes called "Gondran E."
Block 1 (entry): one machine gun cloche and one heavy twin machine gun embrasure.
Block 2 (infantry): one machine gun embrasure.
Block 3 (observation): one observation cloche.

Fort Gondran
Fort Gondran is the center of a series of high-altitude fortifications in the area of Montgenevre, built between 1885 and 1910. The positions were occupied by 800 men, and were known as the "Gondran line."
Gondran A: small infantry position with a breastwork wall shielding the barracks.
Gondran B: small infantry position similar to Gondran A.
Gondran C: Stone fort at  altitude, housing 288 men. Also known as Fort Gondran, built 1887-1890.

Action 
On 18 June 1940 the ouvrage was fired upon by the Italian Fort Chaberton.

Present condition
Gondran is managed by the Association de Vauban à Maginot, which opens it a few days each year, including Bastille Day.

See also
 List of Alpine Line ouvrages

References

Bibliography 
Allcorn, William. The Maginot Line 1928-45. Oxford: Osprey Publishing, 2003. 
Kaufmann, J.E. and Kaufmann, H.W. Fortress France: The Maginot Line and French Defenses in World War II, Stackpole Books, 2006. 
Kaufmann, J.E., Kaufmann, H.W., Jancovič-Potočnik, A. and Lang, P. The Maginot Line: History and Guide, Pen and Sword, 2011. 
Mary, Jean-Yves; Hohnadel, Alain; Sicard, Jacques. Hommes et Ouvrages de la Ligne Maginot, Tome 4 - La fortification alpine. Paris, Histoire & Collections, 2009.  
Mary, Jean-Yves; Hohnadel, Alain; Sicard, Jacques. Hommes et Ouvrages de la Ligne Maginot, Tome 5. Paris, Histoire & Collections, 2009.

External links 
 Gondran (petit ouvrage de) at fortiff.be 
 Gondran (ligne de) at fortiff.be 
 Fort du Gondran at fortiffsere.fr 

GOND
Maginot Line
Alpine Line
World War II museums in France
Fortifications of Briançon